The Iron Wall: Zionist Revisionism from Jabotinsky to Shamir is a 1984 book by the American  Trotskyite Lenni Brenner. It is a highly critical account of the development of Revisionist Zionism. The name of the book is a reference to an essay written by Ze'ev Jabotinsky in 1923.

Reception
Anti-Zionist activist Uri Davis wrote in Race and Class journal in 1985 that The Iron Wall suffered from "pseudo-Freudian causal explanations" and "repeated irresponsible political statements verging on the nonsensensical".

References

External links
Full text

Books critical of Zionism
Jewish anti-Zionism
1984 non-fiction books
History books about Zionism
Revisionist Zionism